The 1991 Ball State Cardinals football team was an American football team that represented Ball State University in the Mid-American Conference (MAC) during the 1991 NCAA Division I-A football season. In its seventh season under head coach Paul Schudel, the team compiled a 6–5 record (4–4 against conference opponents) and finished in a tie for fifth place out of ten teams in the MAC. The team played its home games at Ball State Stadium in Muncie, Indiana.

The team's statistical leaders included Mike Neu with 1,491 passing yards, Corey Croom with 1,053 rushing yards and 48 points scored, Mike LeSure with 629 receiving yards.

Schedule

References

Ball State
Ball State Cardinals football seasons
Ball State Cardinals football